Nolene Conrad (born 26 July 1985) is a South African long-distance runner.

In 2013, she competed in the senior women's race at the 2013 IAAF World Cross Country Championships held in Bydgoszcz, Poland. She finished in 79th place. In 2015, she competed in the senior women's race at the 2015 IAAF World Cross Country Championships held in Guiyang, China. She finished in 36th place.

In 2018, she competed in the women's half marathon at the 2018 IAAF World Half Marathon Championships held in Valencia, Spain. She finished in 25th place.

References

External links 
 

Living people
1985 births
Place of birth missing (living people)
South African female long-distance runners
South African female cross country runners
South African female steeplechase runners
Commonwealth Games competitors for South Africa
Athletes (track and field) at the 2006 Commonwealth Games
Competitors at the 2009 Summer Universiade
Competitors at the 2011 Summer Universiade
Competitors at the 2005 Summer Universiade